Chenar-e Sofla may refer to:

Chenar-e Sofla, Hamadan
Chenar-e Sofla, Kermanshah
Chenar-e Sofla, Sahneh, Kermanshah Province
Chenar-e Sofla, Lorestan
Chenar-e Sofla, Qazvin
Chenar-e Pain, Lorestan